Devon station is a Via Rail flag stop station located in Devon, Ontario (south of Chapleau, Ontario) on the Sudbury – White River train.

Devon, Ontario (most likely named for Devon, England) was first developed by Biglow Lumber which cut railway ties for CP Rail in the 1930s. The railway once had tracks that came off the main line to the Biglow Mill for shipping and receiving purposes. The tracks were removed in the 1990s but much of the rail bed still can be located. Oliver Korpela owned much of the land after the Biglow Lumber company went out of business. Ownership of the lands that were not sold has since been passed to his son Richard. Situated on the south west end of Borden Lake, it primarily serves as a bedroom community to Chapleau. Approximately 25 homes are located in the hamlet. Two businesses are located in the area while Chapleau Lodge is accessed through Devon. The community has electrical, phone and a surfaced road controlled by the Local Road Board. There is no fire protection services. It continues to be a whistle stop for the Via Rail Budd Car service. There is no station building or shelter.

External links
Via Rail page for Devon train station

Via Rail stations in Ontario
Railway stations in Sudbury District